Anemocarpa is a genus of flowering plants in the family Asteraceae, endemic to Australia.

 Species 
 Anemocarpa calcicola  Paul G.Wilson
 Anemocarpa podolepidium (F.Muell.) Paul G.Wilson
 Anemocarpa saxatilis (Paul G.Wilson) PaulG.Wilson

References

Gnaphalieae
Asteraceae genera
Endemic flora of Australia
Taxa named by Paul G. Wilson